River East Center is a Chicago skyscraper that is a part of the larger River East complex.

Description
The tower in River East Center, containing 620 condominium units, stands at 644 feet (196 m) with 58 floors, and was completed in 2001. The building, designed by DeStefano + Partners, originally called for spires atop of the roof on all sides that would have significantly raised the official height to 680 feet. As it stands today, River East Center is the third tallest all-residential building in Chicago.

The building is on the main branch of the Chicago River. A part of the Riverwalk runs along this complex of buildings.

The building shares a common base with the nearby 18 story Embassy Suites Lakefront. The base of River East Center also contains an AMC Theatre, the largest cinema in the city of Chicago with 21 screens.

See also
List of skyscrapers
List of tallest buildings in the United States
List of tallest buildings in Chicago
World's tallest structures

References
Emporis listing
The Residences at River East
Archive of Official Website

Residential buildings completed in 2001
Residential condominiums in Chicago
Residential skyscrapers in Chicago
Streeterville, Chicago
2001 establishments in Illinois